Nonet may refer to:

nonet (music), a composition which requires nine musicians for a performance
Nonet (Farrenc) (1849) by Louise Farrenc
Nonet (Lachner) (1875) by Franz Lachner
Nonet (Villa-Lobos) (1923) by Heitor Villa-Libos
Wind Nonet (Parry) (1877) by Hubert Parry
nonet, a nine line poem, with the first line containing nine syllables, the next eight, so on until the last line has one syllable; see glossary of poetry terms
Nonet, a proton nuclear magnetic resonance spectrum structure with nine peaks
Nonet, a representation of subatomic particles in the quark model
Nonet, another term for a box or region in Sudoku, usually a 3x3 subsection